Chris Muckert (born 24 January 1981) is an Australian former professional rugby league footballer who played as a  and  for the Parramatta Eels and the North Queensland Cowboys in the 2000s.

Playing career
Muckert made his first grade debut for North Queensland in round 7 of the 2001 NRL season against St. George.  In 2004, Muckert moved to Parramatta but only managed to make four appearances for the club before being released at the end of the season and retired from rugby league.

References

1981 births
Australian rugby league players
Parramatta Eels players
Rugby league locks
Living people
North Queensland Cowboys players
Rugby league players from Queensland